Pause is a 2018 Cypriot drama film directed by Tonia Mishiali and starring Stella Fyrogeni.

Production
Pause was filmed in and around Nicosia, Cyprus's capital, in February and March 2017.

Plot

A Cypriot housewife reaches menopause and decides she will no longer tolerate her husband's abuse and disrespect. She enters a world of violent and disturbing fantasies.

Release

Pause premiered at the 2018 Karlovy Vary International Film Festival, as part of the "East of the West" programme. The Hollywood Reporter called it "a work of considerable tonal complexity, as it stirs moments of pitch-black humor and short and violent reveries into an otherwise austerely told tale of spousal strife that wants to smash the patriarchy with feats of cinematic derring-do."

In What Fresh Hell Is This?: Perimenopause, Menopause, Other Indignities and You, Heather Corinna noted that Pause offered "one of the rare sympathetic descriptions of a menopausal mental health struggle."

References

External links
 

2018 films
Cypriot drama films
Greek drama films
2010s Greek-language films
Films shot in Cyprus
Films set in Cyprus
2018 drama films
2018 directorial debut films